Lista is an administrative neighborhood (barrio) of Madrid belonging to the district of Salamanca. As of 1 March 2020, it has a population of 21,362. The Hospital Universitario de la Princesa is located in the neighborhood.

References 

Wards of Madrid
Salamanca (Madrid)